Louis A. Weiss Memorial Hospital, is an urban hospital located in the Uptown neighborhood of Chicago, Illinois. It is a 236-bed hospital, located on the site of what used to be Clarendon Beach, a popular beach of the city.

Until the 2000s, Weiss Hospital had been part of the University of Chicago Hospitals system.

Beginning in July 2012, Weiss Memorial Hospital joined the other four Tenet Healthcare hospitals in Chicago as an Accountable care organization, part of the Center for Medicare and Medicaid's Shared Savings Program.

In January 2019, Tenet Healthcare sold its three remaining Chicago-area for-profit hospitals to Los Angeles-based Pipeline Health, which is partially owned and operated by Dr. Eric E. Whitaker, a friend of former United States president Barack Obama.  The three hospitals in the sale are Louis A. Weiss Memorial Hospital, Chicago, Illinois; Westlake Hospital, Melrose Park, Illinois; and West Suburban Medical Center, Oak Park, Illinois.

Patient care and research

At Weiss Memorial Hospital, various medical specialty services are provided through partnerships and contracts to achieve the best comprehensive care for patients.
 The Chicago ENT specialty practice for ear, nose and throat includes services for diagnostic, treatment and surgical intervention for ENT, as well as, allergy/immunology and audiology services.
 The Strauss Oncology Center at Weiss has a cancer research program that is an accredited through the American College of Surgeons Commission on Cancer. 
 The Chicago Center for Orthopedics (CCO) located at Weiss Memorial Hospital is the first hospital in Chicago to earn the Joint Commission's Gold Seal of Approval® for Joint Replacement-Hip and Joint Replacement–Knee. The center has also earned the Blue Cross and Blue Shield's designation as a Blue Distinction Center® for knee and hip replacement and provides a wide variety of surgical and nonsurgical options to many orthopedic conditions.
 The Women's Health Center at Weiss Hospital has a team of physicians that focus on urological gynecology, gynecological oncology, full fertility services, advanced laparoscopy and general surgery. Several physicians have private Urology practices at Weiss. Many of the gynecologic and urologic surgical procedures are performed by specialists using the most minimally invasive robotic-assisted technology: the advanced Da Vinci surgical system.
 The Center for Integrative Medicine which offers treatments in alternative medicine including acupuncture, healing touch, guided imagery and massage therapy.
 The Chicago Sleep Center offers treatments for sleep disorders and sleep issues by board-certified sleep medicine physicians.
 Chronic pain management services are provided by the APAC Centers for Pain Management, one of the largest pain management companies in the Midwest. 
 Nephrology services are provided by board certified Nephrologists of Optimum Kidney Care, S.C. Specializations include diabetes, kidney disease, resistant hypertension and proteinuria.
 Physicians affiliated with the Eye Surgery Center at Weiss Memorial Hospital include ophthalmologists in academics as well as private practice. 
 Weiss has a negotiated contract with Continental Anesthesia Ltd. for its anesthesia services.
 The Computed Tomography (CT) and Magnetic Resonance Imaging (MRI) departments at Weiss are accredited by the American College of Radiology(ACR).
 Chicago Health Medical Group has partnered with Weiss Memorial Hospital to open a new specialty clinic at the Breakers of Edgewater Beach (5333 N Sheridan Rd, Chicago, IL 60640)

Teaching
The hospital hosts several residency programs including Internal Medicine with approximately 50 residents, including categorical, transitional and preliminary residents, as well as a podiatric medicine and surgery residency with approximately 11 residents. Emergency Medicine residents from Midwestern University also work in the emergency department.

References

External links
 

Tenet Healthcare
Hospital buildings completed in 1953
Hospitals in Chicago